Blaine Municipal Airport  was a city-owned public-use airport, also known as Dierks Field, located one nautical mile (1.8 km) east of the central business district of Blaine, a city in Whatcom County, Washington, United States. It was closed on December 31, 2008.

Facilities and aircraft 
It had one runway designated 14/32 with a 2,539 by 40 feet (774 x 12 m) asphalt pavement. For the 12-month period ending December 31, 2005, the airport had 8,000 aircraft operations, an average of 21 per day, all general aviation. At that time, there were 23 aircraft based at this airport: 91% single-engine and 9% multi-engine.

References

External links 
 Blaine Municipal (4W6) at Washington State DOT Airport Directory

Defunct airports in Washington (state)
Airports in Washington (state)
Transportation buildings and structures in Whatcom County, Washington
Airports with year of establishment missing
Airports disestablished in 2008
2008 disestablishments in Washington (state)